John Ulinder (born 27 July 1943) is a Canadian rower. He competed in the men's coxless pair event at the 1968 Summer Olympics.

References

1943 births
Living people
Canadian male rowers
Olympic rowers of Canada
Rowers at the 1968 Summer Olympics
Sportspeople from British Columbia
People from Ladysmith, British Columbia